The National Quality Standard (or NQS) is the benchmark for the quality of Early Childhood Education & Care in Australia (part of the National Quality Framework (NQF)).

Aim 
The National Quality Standard aims to promote: 
 the safety, health and wellbeing of children 
 a focus on achieving outcomes for children through high-quality educational programs
 families’ understanding of what distinguishes a quality service.

Quality Areas 
The National Quality Standard (NQS) is a key aspect of the NQF. The NQS consists of seven quality areas, each containing standards and elements, that children's education and care services are assessed and rated against.

The seven quality areas covered by the National Quality Standard are:
 
 QA 1 - Educational program and practice
 QA 2 - Children's health and safety
 QA 3 - Physical environment
 QA 4 - Staffing arrangements
 QA 5 - Relationships with children
 QA 6 - Collaborative partnerships with families and communities
 QA 7 - Leadership and service management

See also
Early Years Learning Framework

References

External links
Australian Children's Education and Care Quality Authority
Guide to the National Quality Standard
National Quality Standard Professional Learning Program

Education in Australia